The Pirates (lit. "Pirates: Bandits Going to the Sea") is a 2014 South Korean period adventure film starring Son Ye-jin and Kim Nam-gil.

A standalone sequel, titled The Pirates: The Last Royal Treasure, was released in theaters on January 26, 2022.

Plot
On the eve of the founding of the Joseon Dynasty, a whale swallows the Ming Emperor's Seal of State being brought to Joseon by envoys from China. With a big reward on whoever brings back the royal seal, mountain bandits led by Jang Sa-jung go out to sea to hunt down the whale. But he soon clashes with Yeo-wol, a female captain of pirates, and unexpected adventure unfolds.

Cast

Main characters
Son Ye-jin as Yeo-wol
Lee Do-yeon as young Yeo-wol 
Kim Nam-gil as Jang Sa-jung

Pirates 
Lee Geung-young as So-ma
Shin Jung-geun as Yong-gap
Choi Sulli as Heuk-myo
Lee Yi-kyung as Cham-bok
Kim Kyeong-sik as Subforeman

Bandits 
Yoo Hae-jin as Chul-bong
Kim Won-hae as Choon-seop
Park Chul-min as Monk
Jo Dal-hwan as San-man
Kim Won-joong as Catfish 
Song Yong-ho as Snakehead 
Moon Seong-bok as Eel 
Jeon Won-gyu as Pine cone 
Lee Jae-ho as Cudgel 
Kim Jae-hak as Straw

Joseon officials
Kim Tae-woo as Mo Heung-gap 
Oh Dal-su as Han Sang-jil
Jo Hee-bong as Oh Man-ho
Jung Sung-hwa as Park Mo
Ahn Nae-sang as Jeong Do-jeon
Lee Dae-yeon as Yi Seong-gye

Other characters 
Jeon Bae-soo as Baek Seon-gi 
Park Hae-soo as Hwang Joong-geun 
Lee Gyu-ho as Mool-gom 
Kim Ian as Baek Chi

Release

Domestic
The Pirates sold 272,858 tickets during its first two days of release, placing second on the box office chart behind The Admiral: Roaring Currents. After 17 days in theaters, it became the third Korean film in 2014 to reach 5 million admissions. At the end of its run, the film reached 8,665,269 admissions, and also grossed .

International
Lotte Entertainment pre-sold The Pirates to 15 countries at the 2014 Cannes Film Market.

Reception
The film received mixed reviews from critics and currently holds a 57% rating on Rotten Tomatoes. Martin Tsai of The Los Angeles Times described the film as a "derivative trove of swashbuckling action, romance, comedy, special effects and revisionist history" which contains typical Hollywood devices, while Nicolas Rapold of The New York Times notes that "Neither the action nor the comedy in this action comedy is consistently strong." Frank Scheck of The Hollywood Reporter criticizes the film for its "endless slapstick fight scenes" and the film's special effects but praised the underwater scenes with the whales which he says have a "hauntingly ethereal quality."

Sequel
A sequel of the film titled as The Pirates: The Last Royal Treasure, directed by Kim Jeong-hoon, produced with new cast of Kang Ha-neul and Han Hyo-joo was released on January 26, 2022 by Lotte Entertainment.

Awards and nominations

References

External links
  
 The Pirates at Lotte Entertainment
 
 
 

2014 films
2010s action adventure films
South Korean action adventure films
Films set in the Joseon dynasty
Lotte Entertainment films
Films directed by Lee Seok-hoon
Pirate films
South Korean historical adventure films
2010s historical adventure films
2010s Korean-language films
2010s South Korean films